José Batagliero (1 January 1916 – 11 March 1976) was an Argentine footballer. He played in ten matches for the Argentina national football team from 1940 to 1945. He was also part of Argentina's squad for the 1941 South American Championship.

References

External links
 

1916 births
1976 deaths
Argentine footballers
Argentina international footballers
Place of birth missing
Association football defenders
Club Atlético Atlanta footballers
Club Atlético Independiente footballers